The Steamboat Classic is a running race featuring 4 mile and 15K events in Peoria, Illinois.  In 2007 the race drew over 4000 participants. The four-mile race has been described as the world's fastest. The world best times for both men and women, have been set at the Steamboat Classic.

References

External links
Steamboat Classic — official website

15K runs
Recurring sporting events established in 1974
Sports in Peoria, Illinois
Road running competitions in the United States
Tourist attractions in Peoria, Illinois
1974 establishments in Illinois